Mount Allen is the second-highest peak on Stewart Island/Rakiura in southern New Zealand. It is part of the Rakiura National Park.

References 

Landforms of Stewart Island
Allen